Bondo  is a village and commune and seat of the Cercle of Koro in the Mopti Region of Mali. In 1998 the commune had a population of 15,872 In 2009, population was almost 20,000.

Some typical cultivated plants are millet, sorghum, corn, peanut and sesame.

References

Communes of Mopti Region